

Karl Kriebel (26 February 1888 – 28 November 1961) was a general in the Wehrmacht of Nazi Germany during World War II. He was a recipient of the Knight's Cross of the Iron Cross.

At the beginning of World War II, Kriebel was appointed commander of 56th Infantry Division. Later, he commanded several other divisions. He also served as a deputy member on the "Court of Military Honour," a drumhead court-martial that expelled many of the officers involved in the 20 July Plot from the Army before handing them over to the People's Court.

Awards and decorations

 Knight's Cross of the Iron Cross on 4 July 1940 as Generalmajor and commander of 56. Infanterie-Division

References

Citations

Bibliography

 

1888 births
1961 deaths
German Army generals of World War II
Generals of Infantry (Wehrmacht)
German Army personnel of World War I
Military personnel of Bavaria
Recipients of the Knight's Cross of the Iron Cross
German prisoners of war in World War II held by the United States
People from Alsace-Lorraine
Military personnel from Metz
Recipients of the clasp to the Iron Cross, 1st class
Reichswehr personnel